The country calling code of Bangladesh is +880.

The dial plan type in Bangladesh is closed, and "0" is the Trunk prefix.

When dialling a Bangladesh number from inside Bangladesh, the format is:
"0 – Area/operator code (X) – subscriber number (N)"

When dialling a Bangladesh number from outside Bangladesh, the format is:
"+880 – Area/operator code (X) – subscriber number (N)"

The subscriber number is the number unique to each individual telephone/mobile following the area/operator code. The Area/operator codes in Bangladesh are listed below, with a typical number format, where "X" denotes the Area/Operator code and "N" denotes the individual subscriber's telephone/mobile number.

Area and operator codes 

Mobile Network Operators

Typical format for a mobile phone number is 01XXX NNNNNN, e.g. 01054 694200 when dialed inside Bangladesh, and +880 1XXX NNNNNN when dialed internationally.

13 and 17      - Grameenphone

14 and 19      - Banglalink

15        - TeleTalk

16 and 18 - Robi

10, 12 - Not in use

Fixed line network operators

Typical format for a fixed line telephone number is "+880-XX-NNNN-NNNN"

35  – Bangla Phone

36   – Telebarta

37   – National Phone

38   – PeoplesTel

44   – RanksTel

60   – Bijoy Phone

64   – Onetel

66   – Dhaka Phone

42  - Sheba Phone

BTCL Geographical area codes 
Typical format for a BTCL line number in Dhaka "+880-2-N-NNNN-NNNN"
Typical format for a BTCL line number elsewhere "+880-XXX-NNN-NNNN"
 02    – Dhaka, Gopalganj District, Narayongonj District, Narsingdi District, IMS Number (Malopara, Shalbagan, Tanore, Godagari, Noahata- Rajshahi && Jessore University)
 031   – Chittagong District
 0321  – Noakhali District
 0331  – Feni District
 0341  – Cox's Bazar District
 0351  – Rangamati District
 0361  – Bandarban District
 0371  – Khagrachari District
 0381  – Laxmipur District
 041   – Khulna District
 0421  – Jessore District
 0431  – Barisal District
 0441  – Patuakhali District
 0451  – Jhenaidah District
 0461  – Pirojpur District
 0468  – Bagerhat District
 0471  – Satkhira District
 0481  – Narail District
 0491  – Bhola District
 0498  – Jhalakati District
 051   – Bogra District
 0521  – Rangpur District
 0531  – Dinajpur District
 0541  – Gaibandha District
 0551  – Nilphamari District
 0561  – Thakurgaon District
 0568  – Panchagarh District
 0571  – Joypurhat District
 0581  – Kurigram District
 0591  – Lalmonirhat District
 0611  – Magura District
 0621  – Narsingdi District
 0631  – Faridpur District
 0641  – Rajbari District
 0651  – Manikganj District
 0661  – Madaripur District
 0662  – Shariatpur District
 0671  – Narayongonj District
 0681  – Gazipur District
 0682  – Kaliakair Upazila
 0691  – Munsigonj District
 071   – Kushtia District
 0721  – Rajshahi District 
 0731  – Pabna District
 0741  – Naogaon District
 0751  – Sirajganj District
 0761  – Chuadanga District
 0771  – Natore District
 0781  – Chapai Nowabgonj District
 0791  – Meherpur District
 081   – Comilla District
 0821  – Sylhet District
 0831  – Hobigonj District
 0841  – Chandpur District
 0851  – Brahmonbaria District
 0861  – Moulvibazar District
 0871  – Sunamganj District
 091   – Mymensingh District
 0921  – Tangail District
 0922  – Mirzapur Upazila
 0931  – Sherpur District
 0941  – Kishorgonj District
 0951  – Netrokona District
 0981  – Jamalpur District

IPTSP (IP-Telephony Service Providers)
Typical format for an IP telephone number "+880-96XX-NNNNNN". Licensed providers include:
 9601 - UberNet
 9602 – BTEL
 9604 – FUSION NET
 9606 – Agni Systems Ltd
 9609 – BEXIMCO / BOL
 9610 – ADN Telecom
 9611 - Amber IT(Dhaka Com)
 9612 – MetroNet
 9613 – GETCO Online
 9614 – NextFone
 9619 - Chittagong Online LTD 
 9633 – IDEA Networks and Communications Limited
 9638 - Intercloud Limited
 9666 – BDCom-Kotha
 9669 – ConnectTel
 9678 – Link3 Technologies LTD.
 9677 – BRACNet Limited
 9639 – ICC Communication 
 9654 - Tele Bangla
 9643 - Race Online Ltd
 9696 - BTCL - Alaap

Special Numbers 
333   – Central Helpline of  Bangladesh 
999   – Emergency telephone number
106   – Anti - Corruption Commission
1090   – Weather Update Toll Free
121   – Customer care (Grameenphone, Teletalk,
Robi, Banglalink) 
158   – Customer complaints – all mobile operators
5012  – News 
152   – International Trunk Call Booking
14    – Time (BTCL)
16263 – Free Doctor Consultation / Contact for COVID-19

109 – Violence Against Women, and Children Prevention Helpline 
999 – National Emergency Service

See also
Mobile telephone numbering in India
North American Numbering Plan

References

External links 
useful numbers in Bangladesh
Nationwide dialing codes – BTCL

Bangladesh
Telecommunications in Bangladesh
Bangladesh communications-related lists